M.Turkapally (or Mannevari Turkapalle)  is a village in Yadadri Bhuvanagiri district of the Indian state of Telangana. It is located in Turkapally mandal of Bhongir division.

References

Villages in Nalgonda district
Mandal headquarters in Yadadri Bhuvanagiri district